Willdenowia incurvata is a species of flowering plant in the genus Willdenowia endemic to the Fynbos region of the Northern Cape and Western Cape. It is also known as the sonqua sunreed; or sonkwasriet in Afrikaans.

Distribution 
Willdenowia incurvata is found from False Bay in the Western Cape to Springbok in Namaqualand, in the Northern Cape. It is dominant in the sandveld between Melkbos and the Olifants River, from sea level to the 1 200 m altitude range.

Ecology 
Willdenowia incurvata is a reseeder, it reproduces by reseeding after a fire.

Conservation status 
Willdenowia incurvata is classified as Least Concern as it is widely distributed, with a stable population.

References

External links 

 

Restionaceae
Endemic flora of South Africa
Flora of South Africa
Flora of the Cape Provinces